Dem (Lem, Ndem) is a divergent Papuan language of West New Guinea. Although Palmer (2018) leaves it unclassified, it was tentatively included in the Trans–New Guinea family in the classification of Malcolm Ross (2005), and Timothy Usher ties it most closely to Amung.

The only pronouns which have been recorded are 1sg nau, 2sg aŋ, and 1pl yu.

Vocabulary
The following basic vocabulary words are from Voorhoeve (1975), as cited in the Trans-New Guinea database:

{| class="wikitable sortable"
! gloss !! Dem
|-
| head || yagabuak
|-
| hair || ari; yakuli
|-
| eye || eŋgio
|-
| tooth || yavkasa
|-
| leg || abuo
|-
| louse || nduu
|-
| dog || kwa
|-
| pig || uwam; uwom
|-
| bird || bela
|-
| egg || au; onde
|-
| blood || miet
|-
| skin || aran; asi
|-
| tree || niye
|-
| man || ŋo
|-
| sun || uweməja
|-
| water || da; yat
|-
| fire || kunu
|-
| stone || (da)ŋat
|-
| name || aluŋ; gago
|-
| eat || nenawe
|-
| one || yagaŋ
|-
| two || ugwaŋ
|}

Further reading
Word lists
de Bruijn, J. V. 1941. Verslag van een Tocht naar Beura, het Stroomgebied van de Beurong en Lelop, het Stroomgebiet van de Ielorong in Centraal Nieuw Guinea door den Controleur der Wisselmeren van 9 Juni 1941 tot 7 Augustus 1941 [Report of a Survey Trip to Beura, the Beurong and Lelop Watersheds, the Ielorong Watershed in Central New Guinea by the Wissel Lakes Administrator the 9th of June. 1941 to the 7th of August 1941]. Nationaal Archief, Den Haag, Ministerie van Koloniën: Kantoor Bevolkingszaken Nieuw-Guinea te Hollandia: Rapportenarchief, 1950–1962, nummer toegang 2.10.25, inventarisnummer 256.
Galis, Klaas Wilhelm. 1955. Talen en dialecten van Nederlands Nieuw-Guinea [Languages and dialects of Netherlands New Guinea]. Tijdschrift Nieuw-Guinea 16: 109–118, 134–145, 161–178.
Larson, Gordon F. 1977. Reclassification of some Irian Jaya Highlands language families: A lexicostatistical cross-family subclassification with historical implications. Irian 6(2): 3–40.
Le Roux, C. C. F. M. 1950. De Bergpapoea’s van Nieuw-Guinea en hun Woongebied [The Mountain Papuans of New Guinea and their Habitat], Vol 2. Leiden: E. J. Brill. (pages 852–862, 892–895)
Voorhoeve, Clemens L. 1975. Languages of Irian Jaya, Checklist: Preliminary Classification, Language Maps, Wordlists. Canberra: Pacific Linguistics.

References

Amung–Dem languages
Languages of western New Guinea